Karrinyup bus station is a Transperth bus station located next to Karrinyup Shopping Centre in Karrinyup, approximately 10 kilometres north of Perth, Western Australia. It has four stands and is served by five Transperth routes operated by Swan Transit.

Karrinyup station originally opened in September 1974.

The bus station was refurbished in 2007, providing improved seating and accessible ramps to the adjacent shopping centre, and then subsequently upgraded in 2015.

In 2020, the bus station temporarily moved to the median strip while redevelopment works were carried out at the shopping centre. The bus station reopened at its original location on 5 September 2021.

Bus routes

References

External links
Access Map Transperth

Bus stations in Perth, Western Australia
Karrinyup, Western Australia